The 1974–75 NCAA Division III men's ice hockey season began in November 1974 and concluded on March of the following year. This was the 2nd season of Division III college ice hockey.

Regular season

Standings

See also
 1974–75 NCAA Division I men's ice hockey season
 1974–75 NCAA Division II men's ice hockey season

References

External links

 
NCAA